Giovanni Gaddi may refer to:
Giovanni Gaddi (painter) (1333–1383), Italian painter
Giovanni Gaddi (priest) (1493–1542), Italian cleric